Lightpost is the third extended play by American rock band Mt. Helium, formerly The Apex Theory. Released as a digital download on January 16, 2007, it is the band's first release as a power trio.

Track listing

Personnel
The Apex Theory
 Art Karamian – vocals, guitar
 Dave Hakopyan – bass
 Sammy J. Watson – drums

References

2007 EPs
Mt. Helium EPs